This article lists the orders and deliveries for the Boeing 787 Dreamliner. As of December 2022, the largest airline order is by United Airlines for 170 aircraft.

Orders and deliveries

Orders and deliveries by type and year
{| class="wikitable" style="margin:1em 1em 1em 300; border:1px #aaa solid;  background:#fbf8db;"
|+ Boeing 787 orders and deliveries by type
|- style="font-weight:bold; background:#ccddff; padding:0.4em;"
|  ||Total orders||Total deliveries||Unfilled
|-
|787-8||416||386||30
|-
|787-9||1,010||580||430
|-
|787-10||189||75||114
|- style="font-weight:bold;"
| Total || 1,615 || 1,041 || 574
|}

Boeing 787 orders and deliveries (cumulative, by year):

 

Orders and deliveries .

Orders and deliveries sortable, presorted by customer

Data through February 2023.

Orders and deliveries graph

Data through February 2023.

See also
List of Airbus A350 orders and deliveries
List of Boeing 787 operators

Notes

References
Footnotes

Citations

External links
 Boeing/McDonnell Douglas Orders and Deliveries

Orders
787